Algerian Franco-Muslim Rally (in French: Rassemblement Franco-Musulman Algérien) was an assimilationist political party in colonial Algeria founded in 1945. RFMA was led by Dr. Bendjelloul.

Sources
Tlemcani, Rachid, State and Revolution in Algeria. Boulder: Westview Press, 1986.

Defunct political parties in Algeria
Political parties established in 1945
1945 establishments in Algeria
Political parties with year of disestablishment missing